Mitchell Brown (born 15 August 1993) is a New Zealand rugby union player who currently plays as a lock or loose forward for  in New Zealand's domestic Mitre 10 Cup and the  in the international Super Rugby competition.

Early career

Born and raised in New Plymouth on New Zealand's North Island, he attended New Plymouth Boys' High School in his hometown where he played first XV rugby.   After leaving school, he started playing for Ingelwood in Taranaki's club rugby competition.

Senior career

Brown debuted for his home province, Taranaki in a Ranfurly Shield defense against King Country in 2012 while aged just 18 years old, but had to wait until the following year before making his national provincial championship bow.

In 2015 he began to establish himself as a regular starter, playing 9 times, mainly as a lock as the Bulls were knocked out at the semi-final stage. They again reached the tournament's last 4 in 2016, with Brown playing in all 11 of their games during the campaign.

Super Rugby

An injury crisis among the  loose forwards during the 2016 Super Rugby season saw Brown called up as an injury replacement.   He made 2 substitute appearances and also started the Chiefs one-off midweek match against .   He was subsequently named in the franchise's full squad for the 2017 season.

International

Brown turned out for New Zealand Under-17 in 2010 and was a New Zealand Schools representative in 2011.

Career Honours

Taranaki

Mitre 10 Cup Premiership - 2014

Super Rugby Statistics

References

1993 births
Living people
New Zealand rugby union players
Rugby union locks
Rugby union flankers
Rugby union number eights
Taranaki rugby union players
People educated at New Plymouth Boys' High School
Rugby union players from New Plymouth
Chiefs (rugby union) players
Yokohama Canon Eagles players